"I'm Not Ashamed" is a song by Scottish rock band Big Country, which was released in 1995 as the lead single from their seventh studio album Why the Long Face. It was written by Stuart Adamson, and produced by Big Country and Chris Sheldon. "I'm Not Ashamed" reached No. 69 on the UK Singles Chart.

A music video was filmed to promote the single. It was directed by Desmond Webb and produced by Marc Wilkinson for Frontline Films.

Background
Speaking to the Weekly Post & Free Press Recorder in 1995, Adamson said of the song: "Lyrics come to you at the most bizarre times. I was out for a run in Lincolnshire, and all of a sudden I'd got this lyric. I ran back to the studio where we were recording and wrote the entire lyric for "I'm Not Ashamed"."

The single's release date had to be postponed a number of times. Approximately 2,000 copies of the single reached the shops a week before the finalised 30 May release date due to an administrative error, which resulted in the first week of sales not counting towards the single's chart position. It also resulted in both editions of the CD single being released at the same time, rather than one a week after the other. On its release, "I'm Not Ashamed" received limited airplay on national radio but was more successful in generating plays on regional stations.

In 2006, Tony Butler described "I'm Not Ashamed" as a "great anthemic track" and added: "I always felt that the lyrics were too sophisticated to be a single but it does have some of my favourite chord progressions in the intro section."

Critical reception
In a review of Why the Long Face, Jerry Ewing of Metal Hammer wrote: "Why the Long Face is all muscular riffs, rock solid rhythms and singalong chorus[es]. The opening salvo of "You Dreamer", "Message of Love" and "I'm Not Ashamed" set out the band's agenda perfectly; rousing hard rock in the finest British tradition that remains evergreen and peerless." Allan Glen, in his 2011 book Stuart Adamson: In a Big Country, considered the song "lyrically very dark and introspective" which was "completely at odds with the British music press who were "preoccupied with the loud, brash and life-affirming sounds of Britpop".

In a review of the 2018 deluxe edition of Why the Long Face, the Hartlepool Mail commented: "The singles, "I'm Not Ashamed" and "You Dreamer", are the equal of most of their more celebrated back catalogue, but made little impact [at the time]." Peter Roche of AXS noted the song's "reflections on personal triumphs and private travails". John Bergstrom of PopMatters described "I'm Not Ashamed" as a "chunky rock number" on which the band "come across like Living Colour".

Track listing
Cassette and CD single
"I'm Not Ashamed" (Single Edit) - 3:44
"One in a Million" (1st Visit) - 5:20
"Monday Tuesday Girl" - 3:55
"I'm Not Ashamed" (Full Version) - 4:12

CD single #2
"I'm Not Ashamed" (Single Edit) - 3:44
"Crazytimes" - 4:05
"Big Country" - 3:16
"Blue on a Green Planet" (Cool Version) - 4:40

Personnel
Big Country
 Stuart Adamson - vocals, guitar
 Bruce Watson - guitar
 Tony Butler - bass, backing vocals
 Mark Brzezicki - drums, percussion, backing vocals

Production
 Chris Sheldon - producer on "I'm Not Ashamed", mixing and engineer
 Big Country - producers (all tracks)
 Graham Stewart - assistant engineer
 George Marino - mastering

Charts

References

1995 songs
1995 singles
Big Country songs
Songs written by Stuart Adamson
Song recordings produced by Chris Sheldon